Transmissivity may refer to:
 Transmissivity (hydrology), the rate at which groundwater flows horizontally through an aquifer 
 Transmittance, the effectiveness of transmitting radiant energy though a volume